Indirect elections were held for the presidency and vice-presidency of the government of the Republic of China on Taiwan on March 21, 1972. The vote took place at the Chung-Shan Building in Yangmingshan, Taipei. Incumbent President Chiang Kai-shek, aged 85, was re-elected for the fifth term with his Vice President Yen Chia-kan. President Chiang died in office on April 5, 1975. Vice President Yen Chia-kan then sworn in as the President.

Electors

The election was conducted by the National Assembly in its meeting place Chung-Shan Building in Yangmingshan, Taipei. According to the Temporary Provisions against the Communist Rebellion, National Assembly delegates elected in the following elections were eligible to vote:
 1947 Chinese National Assembly election, and
 1969 Taiwanese legislative election.
In total, there were 1,344 delegates reported to the secretariat to attend this fifth session of the first National Assembly.

Results

President

Vice president

See also
 History of Republic of China
 President of the Republic of China
 Vice President of the Republic of China

References

Presidential elections in Taiwan
1972 in Taiwan
Taiwan
March 1972 events in Asia